Eilema pulverosa is a moth of the  subfamily Arctiinae. It is found in Cameroon, Ghana, Nigeria, Togo and Uganda.

References

pulverosa
Fauna of Togo
Moths of Africa